Vasudevan Srinivas (born 6 June 1958) is an Indian mathematician who specialises in  algebraic geometry. He is a Senior Professor in the School of Mathematics of Tata Institute of Fundamental Research, Mumbai.

Srinivas received the  BSc degree from Bangalore University and did his MS (1978) and PhD (1982) degrees at the University of Chicago. Spencer Bloch was his research supervisor. He began his academic career at the Tata Institute of Fundamental Research, Mumbai as a visiting fellow in 1983.

Srinivas has worked mainly in algebraic geometry specialising in the study of algebraic cycles on singular algebraic varieties. He has also worked on the interface with commutative algebra: on projective modules, divisor class groups, unique factorization domains, and Hilbert functions and multiplicity.

He was awarded the Shanti Swarup Bhatnagar Prize for Science and Technology in 2003, the highest science award in India,  in the mathematical sciences category. 

He is married to the mathematician V. Trivedi.

Other awards/honours
 Indian National Science Academy Medal for Young Scientists, 1987
 B.M. Birla Science Prize in Mathematics for the year 1995
 Fellow of the Indian National Science Academy, New Delhi 
 TWAS Prize (2008)
 Fellow of the American Mathematical Society, 2012

References

1958 births
Living people
20th-century Indian mathematicians
Bangalore University alumni
University of Chicago alumni
Academic staff of Tata Institute of Fundamental Research
Fellows of the American Mathematical Society
TWAS laureates
Recipients of the Shanti Swarup Bhatnagar Award in Mathematical Science